Samuel Bartram (22 January 1914 – 17 July 1981) was an English professional footballer and manager. He played as a goalkeeper and holds the record for most appearances for Charlton Athletic, his only club at the professional level.

Career
After school, Sam Bartram became a miner and played as either centre-forward or wing-half in non-league football in the North-East of England. As a teenager he had an unsuccessful trial with Reading. When his local village club Boldon Villa were without a goalkeeper for a cup final in 1934, Bartram took over in goal. A scout from Charlton Athletic, Anthony Seed, was watching the game and Bartram played so well that Seed recommended him to his brother Jimmy Seed, the Charlton Secretary Manager. Anthony Seed was Charlton's chief scout in the north east.

In his first three years with Charlton, the club rose from Division Three to runners-up in the top division. He played in goal for the Addicks for 22 years, ignoring unofficial guest appearances elsewhere during wartime, and was never dropped from the team until he retired in 1956. He is considered one of Charlton's greatest players, and their finest goalkeeper. He played in four finals at Wembley between 1943 and 1947 (the FA Cup Final in 1946 and 1947, and the Southern Football League War Cup in 1944 and 1945), winning the FA Cup in 1947. During the semi-final against Newcastle United at Elland Road on 29 March 1947, Bartram was suffering from food poisoning, so played with a hot poultice on his stomach.

During the Second World War, Bartram guested for York City, Liverpool and West Ham United. He also became a physical training instructor.

Although Bartram toured Australia with an England XI in 1951 and played for the England B team, he was burdened with the unwanted praise of 'the finest goalkeeper never to play for England' as the England national football team had both Frank Swift and Ted Ditchburn jostling for the goalkeeper position.

On 6 March 1954, he set an English Football League record with 500 League appearances. He was runner-up in the 1954 Footballer of the Year vote at the age of 40.

Bartram is the oldest player to have played for Charlton, playing until he was 42, and in 1956, after a record 623 appearances, he left to manage York City. In 1960, he became manager of Luton Town, prior to a career as a football columnist for The People. He spent his final years in Harpenden.

Fog Incident
Bartram was involved in a well reported incident when thick fog closed in on a game he was playing against Chelsea at Stamford Bridge:

"Soon after the kick-off," he wrote in his autobiography, "[fog] began to thicken rapidly at the far end, travelling past Vic Woodley in the Chelsea goal and rolling steadily towards me. The referee stopped the game, and then, as visibility became clearer, restarted it. We were on top at this time, and I saw fewer and fewer figures as we attacked steadily."

The game went unusually silent but Sam remained at his post, peering into the thickening fog from the edge of the penalty area. And he wondered why the play was not coming his way. 
"After a long time," he wrote, 'a figure loomed out of the curtain of fog in front of me. It was a policeman, and he gaped at me incredulously. "What on earth are you doing here?" he gasped. "The game was stopped a quarter of an hour ago. The field's completely empty'.And when I groped my way to the dressing-room, the rest of the Charlton team, already out of the bath and in their civvies, were convulsed with laughter."

Legacy and personal life

In 1976/7 an estate was built at the Jimmy Seed end of the ground consisting of a block of flats and seven houses, named Sam Bartram Close.

In 2006, a nine-foot statue of Sam Bartram was erected outside Charlton's stadium, The Valley, to celebrate the club's centenary.

Fifty years after his retirement, Charlton named Bartram's bar and restaurant at the Valley in his honour.

He was the nephew of Jimmy Bartram, a forward who featured for Falkirk in Scotland.

Managerial statistics

References

External links

1914 births
1981 deaths
Sportspeople from Jarrow
Footballers from Tyne and Wear
Footballers from County Durham
English footballers
Association football goalkeepers
Boldon Community Association F.C. players
Charlton Athletic F.C. players
York City F.C. wartime guest players
Liverpool F.C. wartime guest players
West Ham United F.C. wartime guest players
English Football League players
FA Cup Final players
England B international footballers
England wartime international footballers
English football managers
Luton Town F.C. managers
York City F.C. managers
English Football League managers
Brentford F.C. wartime guest players
English miners
English columnists